is an educational anime television series directed by Osamu Yamasaki and produced by WAO World. The anime aired between July 9, 2016 and September 24, 2016 and was simulcast by Funimation. Later it was confirmed that Crunchyroll added the series alongside Three Leaves, Three Colors and Omamori Himari on their catalog since December 21, 2016.

Plot
Mari Hayase is the daughter of a scientist, Eiji, who vanished three years ago. He left behind a pendant known as the armillary compass. One day, after coming across a mysterious book, the compass glows and sends Mari back in time. Supported by her best friend Waka Mizuki and Waka's brother Shun, Mari travels through time in search of her missing father and along the way meets famous scientists who changed the way people think about electricity.

Characters

Main characters

A second-year 10th grade student and Waka's friend. Daughter of a great patissier and a brilliant scientist. While relatively skilled at cooking and tasting, her academic performance is somewhat random (for instance, when a science test question concerning reflection asked how her reflection in a mirror would look, she responded "it looks cute"). Subtle hints that she have feelings for Shun. She first slipped into the past by accidentally touching a book she stumbled upon in Shun's room; who was passed to him by Mari's father. Got captured by Mikage and forced to slip back to the past to find Eiji after finding out about the machine. Got saved by her father in the midst of a time paradox, but managed to return safely to the future after Shun saved them. She became a scientist in the future, discovering the time machine; following the aftermath of her father.

Mari's second-year classmate and best friend and Shun's younger sister. She has a crush on fellow classmate Futa. She is also the first person to witness Mari slipping back to the past and informed Shun about it. Waka also happened to accidentally slipped back to the past along with Mari, and was unable to come back and panicked while she was alone in the past- different from how Mari reacted when she first slipped back to the past.

A third-year 12th grade Waka's older brother who aims to be a doctor in the future. Eiji passed a book to him and Mari stumbled upon it, allowing her first time slip to happen. He found out that in the future, along with Mari, he would become a scientist who discovered the time machine.

Akira's husband. Mari and Rika's father. A passionate scientific researcher, he tends to become excessively engrossed in his studies and expeditions; the day after his wedding he disappeared for half a year without any contact, and hasn't seen or contacted his wife or daughters in three years. Found him to be in most of the past traveled when Mari slipped back. Happened to find out in one of the past journey that Mari was captured by Mikage, and tried to save his daughter only to have a time paradox occur in the midst of it.

A member of the soccer team and a classmate of Mari and Waka. Despite being oblivious, Waka has a crush on him.

The main antagonist of the series. A cold-hearted businessman who is interested in the timeslip machine, the "matter transporter", which was stored in the laboratory. He captured Mari, her mother, and the Mizuki siblings inside the lab after discovering the machine in the basement. He forced Mari to return to the past with him in order to locate Eiji, only resulting in himself being trapped in the past due to the occurrence of a time paradox in the final episode.

Scientists

Other characters

Eiji's wife and mother of Mari and Rika. She's a professional patissier.

Mari's younger sister.

Shun and Waka's mother.

Mikage's assistant.

Media

Anime
A 12 episode anime television series aired between July 9, 2016 and September 24, 2016 on TV Tokyo. Funimation have licensed the anime for streaming.

Episode List

Notes

References

External links 
 

2016 anime television series debuts
Anime with original screenplays
Funimation